Wilcox is an unincorporated community located in the town of Grover, Marinette County, Wisconsin, United States.

Wilcox was named for a local settler.

References

External links

Unincorporated communities in Marinette County, Wisconsin
Unincorporated communities in Wisconsin